Jonty Hurwitz (born 2 September 1969 in Johannesburg) is a British South African artist, engineer and entrepreneur. Hurwitz creates scientifically inspired artworks and anamorphic sculptures. He is recognised for the smallest human form ever created using nano technology.

Early life
Jonty Hurwitz was born in Johannesburg, South Africa, to Selwin, a hotelier and entrepreneur and Marcia Berger, a drama lecturer and teacher. Jonty and his sister (Tamara) spent their early life living in small hotels in rural towns in South Africa while his father built up his business.

Jonty studied Electrical Engineering at the University of the Witwatersrand in Johannesburg from 1989 to 1993. His major was Signal Processing. He then joined the University of Cape Town Remote Sensing Group as a full-time researcher under Professor Michael Inggs, publishing a paper on radar pattern recognition.

Following his research post, Hurwitz traveled for a long period of time in India studying Yoga and wood carving.

Career in art
Hurwitz's work focuses on the aesthetics of art in the context of human perception. His early body of sculpture was discovered by Estelle Lovatt during 2011 in an article for Art of England Magazine: "Thinning the divide gap between art and science, Hurwitz is cognisant of the two being holistically co-joined in the same way as we are naturally, comfortably split between our spiritual and operational self".

Hurwitz began producing sculptures in 2008. In 2009, his first sculpture 'Yoda and the Anamorph' won the People's Choice Bentliff Prize of the Maidstone Museum and Art Gallery. Later in 2009 he won the Noble Sculpture Prize and was commissioned to install his first large scale work (a nude study of his father called 'Dietro di me') in the Italian village Colletta di Castelbianco. In 2010, he was selected as a finalist for the 4th International Arte Laguna Prize in Venice, Italy.

In January 2013, Hurwitz's anamorphic work was described by the art blogger Christopher Jobson. In early 2013 Hurwitz was introduced to the Savoy Hotel by London art agent Sally Vaughan. Hurwitz was commissioned to be Artist in Residence at the hotel and produce a sculpture of the hotel's historically iconic Mascot Kaspar the Cat. Hurwitz lived for several months in the hotel producing the sculpture. By late 2013, in a special edition of Art of England on portraiture, Hurwitz was cited as the No. 1 portrait artist in the UK. In January 2014 Hurwitz was voted No. 46 in the top 100 artists of 2013 by the American art site, Empty Kingdom. In the same month, Hurwitz's anamorphic work was blogged as "The best of 2013" by the American Art and Culture magazine, Juxtapoz. In 2013 Hurwitz's work was also curated by Science Gallery International for a touring group show entitled 'Illusion' curated by Trinity College Dublin. The exhibition led to a 2014/2015 tour in the USA, Kuala Lumpur, Malaysia and Leipzig, Germany.

In late 2014, he released a series of "nano sculptures" under the title of ″Trust″. This series of works captured the attentions of both the scientific and art community, being cited by among others, Nature, Scientific American, Popular Science and Phys.org. In 2015, Hurwitz was elected a member of the Royal British Society of Sculptors. In a 2015 documentary by CNN International on Hurwitz's artwork, BBC Radio 2 art critic Estelle Lovatt commented on Hurwitz's work: "If Leonardo da Vinci were alive today, he would have been doing what Jonty is doing.  He would have been using algorithms. No one else works like him today.  His art is the mix between the emotional and the intelligent, and that's what gives it that spark." In 2016 the Royal Photographic Society selected a scanning electron microscope photograph by Hurwitz and Stefan Diller as one of the top 100 'Royal Society International Images for Science'.

Anamorphic sculpture

Hurwitz has produced a body of work using both oblique (perspective) and catoptric (mirror) anamorphosis. Hurwitz names William Scrots, Hans Holbein, M. C. Escher and Da Vinci as influences. In his online talks, Hurwitz explains that this is a function of processing power and that whilst painting is possible in a mirror, three dimensional anamorphosis could only have come into being with the advent of powerful computers. Each of his sculptures involves billions of calculations using an algorithm derived from the mathematical constant π. Hurwitz asserts that his art is "contemporary to the millisecond". Kinetic Art curator and director of the London Kinetica Museum, Dianne Harris, described Hurwitz's art as "the works of polymath Jonty Hurwitz are contemporary trompe-l'œil, at first glance appearing abstract, but in mirrored reflections, representational".

Nano sculpture
In 2014, Hurwitz worked in the field of Nanoart using multiphoton lithography and photogrammetry to create the world's smallest human portraits of his first love. The works of art were inspired by the nineteenth century marble sculpture of Cupid and Psyche by Antonio Canova. Smaller details of the works are at approximately the 300 nanometer scale, similar to the wavelengths of visible light and hence visualised by a scanning electron microscope. To create these works Hurwitz collaborated with a team of over 20 people, including Stephan Hengsbach of the Karlsruhe Institute of Technology and Yehiam Prior of the Weizmann Institute of Science. In February 2015, Hurwitz's sculpture "Trust" was awarded the world record for the "Smallest sculpture of a human" by the Guinness Book of Records.

Technology
Hurwitz is the Founder and Chairman of the AI research company [Daizy], overseeing the long-term research towards building a generative AI model able to give investment analytics on companies, with a focus on [Risk] and [ESG].  He is also the co-founder of Claim Technology Ltd.

Hurwitz arrived in London in 1995 following his travels in India and got his first job researching financial data visualization for Gilbert de Botton, Chairman and Founder of Global Asset Management (GAM). Hurwitz left Global Asset Management after two years forming his own company, Delve, to develop the R&D in financial data visualisation. In 1996, GAM launched its financial reporting technology built by Hurwitz. Hurwitz's newly formed graphics and software team evolved over several years publishing several visualization projects (non-exhaustive list) like News International visual archives on the Cold War and the Industrial Revolution (1997), Biosys an environmental simulation published by Take 2 Interactive (1998) and "Oceans of Innovation" by the British Foreign Office (1998). The latter work was nominated for a BAFTA Award. In 2005, Hurwitz's company Delve was acquired by Alternative Investment Market listed company Statpro Group PLC (SOG). Hurwitz joined Statpro as Creative Director where he designed the first Cloud Computing analytics and risk platform for asset data. In 2008, Statpro launched its flagship product Statpro Revolution which was the result of this R&D. By 2014, eight out of the top ten largest asset managers in the world were Statpro Clients.

Hurwitz was co-founding Chief Technology Officer of Wonga.com in 2007 where he designed and built the first real-time online consumer loan system in the world. During this period, Wonga's technology won several awards (listed below). By 2011, Wonga had begun to attract criticism and Hurwitz, as the inventor of the technology, found himself with not enough influence to guide the now large company's use of his designs. After several attempts at changing Wonga's strategy, he resigned from his operational role in November 2011, and released his sculpture entitled Co-Founder.

Hurwitz's technology is credited with several innovations in the financial services industry:
Financial sliders. A User Interface innovation which allowed customers to easily to get a real-time quote on the exact cost of a loan in pound and pennies. This method of communicating loan information to consumers has been adopted by several of the major high street UK lenders. These include (non-exhaustive list): HSBC, Royal Bank of Scotland, Barclays, Halifax, Lloyds, Nationwide, Santander Bank, Co-operative Bank, NatWest and Bank of Scotland.
Real-time risk technology. Wonga's risk engine was the first ever to evaluate the credit worthiness of a customer in near real time on the internet based on the collection of data from alternative sources in combination with traditional credit scores. The consumer risk technology provided the ability to transfer money to customers within 12 minutes on the basis of the decision.

Publications

TEDx Talk
 The Art and Science of Love: The World's Smallest Sculpture, TEDx MPI Stuttgart, Baden-Württemberg, Germany.

Academic references and citations

Anamorphic projection on an arbitrary uneven surface, Cej, Rok and Solina, Franc (2020, Univerza v Ljubljani, Slovenia

Beyond Interactions, 2019. JA Nocera. INTERACT 2019 IFIP TC 13 Workshops, Paphos, Cyprus, September 2–6, 2019, Revised Selected Papers.

Technology and the Arts: Current Works of Eric Whitaker and Jonty Hurwitz. International Science and Technology Conference (ISTEC) 2015, St. Petersburg, Russia. Written and presented by Mark Konewko, Marquette University, Wisconsin, USA.
Nanotechnology Cleans Up, Carolien Coon, Physics World, May 2016.

Two Photon Absorption & Carrier Generation in Semiconductors. F.R. Palomo1, I. Vila, M.Fernández, P.DeCastro, M. Moll, Departamento Ingeniería Electrónica, Escuela Superior de Ingenieros Universidad de Sevilla, Spain, Instituto de Física de Cantabria, Santander, Spain, SSD Group, CERN, Geneva, Switzerland.

The Magic of Anamorphosis in Elementary and Middle School. Marina Barreto and Diego Lieban, Proceedings of Bridges 2017: Mathematics, Art, Music, Architecture, Education, Culture Pages 553–556.

Sanat ve Tasarımda Anamorfik Görüntüler (Anamorphic Images in Art and Design). Bengisu KELEŞOĞLU, Mehtap UYGUNGÖZ, Anadolu University Art & Design Magazine, Issue 7, 2016.

Anamorphosis in the work of foreign artists at the end of the XX-XXI century (Russian), статья в журнале – научная статья, YOUTH BULLETIN OF THE ST PETERSBURG STATE INSTITUTE OF CULTURE, 2(6), pages 136–139,2016.
Art and Science Education in Optics: From Multidisciplinary to Transdisciplinary (Arte e Ciência no Ensino de Óptica: Da Multidisciplinaridade à Transdisciplinaridade), Claudemir Batista, Edivaldo Lima, Universidade de São Paulo, e-Disciplinas, Sistema de Apoio às Disciplinas.

Documentaries
"Is this the World's Smallest Sculpture?". A documentary on Hurwitz's nano sculpture made by CNN featuring curator of the Tate Modern, Chris Dercon, sculptor Antony Gormley and art critic Estelle Lovatt. CNN Ones to Watch shines a spotlight on the up-and-coming creative talents set to be the next big names in culture and the arts. Published online and on CNN International, March 2015.

Charity
Hurwitz is founder of the Separated Child Foundation which supports unaccompanied refugee children arriving on UK shores.

Awards and nominations

Art and design awards
 1998, BAFTA Interactive Nomination, Best use of moving image (Delve)
 1998, BIMA, British Interactive Media Association Awards (Delve)
 1999, IVCA, International Visual Communications Association, Gold Award (Delve)
 2009, Noble Sculpture Prize, Liguria, Italy
 2009, Bentlif Art Prize, Maidstone Museum & Art Gallery, People Choice Award, United Kingdom
 2000, IVCA, International Visual Communications Association, Nomination, Award for Innovation (Delve)
 2000, New Media Age Nomination, Special Award for Innovation (Delve)
 2010, Arte Laguna Prize, Finalist, Venice, Italy 
 2010, Gofigurative Art Prize, Peoples Vote, London, United Kingdom
 2015, Guinness World Records, The Smallest Sculpture of a Human Form
 2015, Guinness World Records, The Smallest Animal Sculpture
 2016, The Royal Photographic Society, Finalist, International Images for Science

Technology awards
(Teams under Hurwitz's creative direction)
 2021, Best AI Enabled Sustainable Investment Platform - Wealth & Finance International (Daizy)
 2010, 8th in Startups 100, Startups.co.uk – recognises the UK's most innovative new companies (Wonga)
 2010, 1st in '10 European Technology Companies to Watch', Telegraph (Wonga)
 2010, 2nd in Guardian's Tech Media Invest 100, Guardian (Wonga)
 2010, Best Site of the Year – Banking & Bill Payment Category, Webby Awards (Wonga)
 2010, Best Use of Technology, Fast Growth Business Awards (Wonga)
 2009, Credit Risk Team of the Year, Credit Today Awards (Wonga)
 2009, Most Innovative Application of Technology – Customer, Financial Innovation Awards (Wonga)
 2009, IMA Outstanding Achievement Award – financial services category (Wonga)
 2008, Highly commended – Orange Best Use of Technology (Wonga)
 2002, BIMA Nomination, Banking and Financial Services Technology (Delve)  
 2001, EMMA, Technical Excellence, Interactivity (Delve)  
 2000, BIMA Nomination, New Consumer Focused Services Online (Delve)

Exhibitions

 2020, Science Gallery, Venice
 2020, Eden Fine Art, London
 2020, Eden Fine Art, Soho, New York, USA
 2019, Body+Soul exhibition, One Canada Square, London
 2019, SCOPE Art Show, Miami USA
 2019, Galerie Saint Martin Courchevel and St Tropez, France
 2019, Parallel Lines - Drawing and Sculpture Exhibition, The Lightbox Museum, Woking
 2019, The Cotswold Sculpture Park, Cirencester
 2019, ArtCatto Gallery at the Conrad Algarve, Portugal
 2019, Lausanne Art Fair, Beaulieu Exhibition Center, Switzerland
 2019, Canwood Gallery,  United Kingdom
 2018, Guangdong Science Center, China
 2018, Puke Ariki Museum, New Zealand
 2018, Gallerie Art&Emotion, Lausanne, Switzerland
 2018, Zingst Photography Festival, Zingst, Germany
 2018, Canwood Gallery, Herefordshire, United Kingdom
 2018, Geffen Gallery, Jerusalem, Israel
 2017, SCOPE Art Show with Modus Art Gallery, Miami, USA
 2017, Oregon Museum of Science and Industry, USA
 2017, ArtCatto Gallery, Loulé, Portugal
 2017, Science Centre Singapore, Singapore
 2017, Kinetica Museum 10 Year Anniversary Exhibition, London, United Kingdom
 2017, Liberty Science Center, New York, USA
 2016, Walton Fine Arts, London, United Kingdom
 2016, Opera Gallery, London, United Kingdom
 2016, Gallerie de Medicis, Paris, France
 2016, Kunstkraftwerk Museum, Leipzig, Germany
 2016, International Images for Science, The Royal Photographic Society, London
 2015, Discovery Place Museum of Science and Technology, Charlotte, USA
 2015, Petrosains Museum, Kuala Lumpur
 2014, Art and the Internet, Gofigurative Gallery, Hampstead, London
 2014, Kinetica Art Fair, Truman Brewery, London
 2014, Fleet Science Center, San Diego
 2014, Threadneedle Prize Exhibition, ICA London

 2013, Savoy Hotel, Unveiling of Kaspar the Anamorphic Cat sculpture, Solo show
 2013, Old Street Art, Gofigurative Gallery, Solo Show, London
 2012, Kinetica Art Fair, London
 2011, Tower 42, City of London, Solo show
 2011, Art London, Royal Hospital, Chelsea, London
 2011, Bloomsbury Art Show (represented by Arthur Ackerman Gallery), London
 2011, Untitled Artists Fair, London
 2010, Arthur Ackermann Gallery, London
 2010, Unveiling of Dietro di me, Bernard Noble Sculpture Foundation, Colletta, Italy
 2010, Art London, Represented by Arthur Ackermann Gallery, London
 2010, Go Figurative Show, Real Broadgate, Broadgate Circle, London
 2010, Go Figurative Show, Real Hampstead, St. Stephen's, London
 2010, Untitled Art Fair, London
 2010, Arte Laguna Prize, Arsenale, Venice
 2009, Lloyd Gill Gallery Christmas Exhibition
 2009, Bentlif Gallery, Maidstone Museum & Art Gallery

References

External links
Jonty Hurwitz website
Jonty Hurwitz on Saatchi Art

South African engineers
South African inventors
University of the Witwatersrand alumni
1969 births
Living people
British sculptors
British male sculptors
English engineers
Science in art
Mathematical artists
21st-century inventors